Sami Sauiluma (born 14 February 1993) is an Australian professional rugby league footballer who has played in the National Rugby League.

Background
Born in Bankstown, New South Wales, Sauiluma is of Samoan descent and played his junior rugby league for the Woden Valley Rams, before being signed by the Canberra Raiders.

Sauiluma is a cousin of Wests Tigers player Tim Simona.

Playing career

Early career
From 2009 to 2011, Sauiluma played for the Canberra Raiders' NYC team, before moving on to the Raiders' New South Wales Cup team, Mount Pritchard Mounties in 2012.

2013
In Round 15 of the 2013 NRL season, Sauiluma made his NRL debut for the Canberra Raiders against the Wests Tigers. On 19 September, he was named in the Samoan train-on squad for the 2013 Rugby League World Cup, but didn't make the final cut.

2014
On 21 September, Sauiluma was named at centre in the 2014 New South Wales Cup Team of the Year. On 25 September, he signed a 1-year contract with the Cronulla-Sutherland Sharks starting in 2015.

2015
In round 9 of the 2015 NRL season, Sauiluma made his Cronulla-Sutherland debut against the New Zealand Warriors. On 27 September, he was named at centre in the 2015 New South Wales Cup Team of the Year, for a second year in a row. At the conclusion of the 2015 season, he was released by Cronulla-Sutherland. In November, he joined the Gold Coast Titans to train in the 2016 pre-season and attempt to gain a contract but this proved unsuccessful.

References

External links
NRL profile
2015 Cronulla-Sutherland Sharks profile

1991 births
Australian rugby league players
Australian sportspeople of Samoan descent
Canberra Raiders players
Cronulla-Sutherland Sharks players
Burleigh Bears players
Mount Pritchard Mounties players
Rugby league centres
Rugby league wingers
Rugby league second-rows
Living people
Rugby league players from Sydney